The Grand Prix was a classic greyhound competition held at Walthamstow.

It was first run in 1945 and in 1971 it was granted classic status. The race came to an end following the closure of Walthamstow in 2008.
The race is not to be confused with the Arena Racing Company Grand Prix held at Sunderland.

The competition was not run from 1952 until 1953 due to insufficient entries and again from 1964 to 1965. The event was cancelled in 1965 following the refusal by the National Greyhound Racing Club to allow a change in race distance.

Venue and Distances
1945–1958 (Walthamstow 525 yards)
1960–1963 (Walthamstow 500 yards)
1966–1974 (Walthamstow 600 yards)
1976–2007 (Walthamstow 640 metres)

Past winners

Discontinued

Sponsors
1994-1998 Laurent-Perrier
2001–2007 Victor Chandler Bookmakers

References

Greyhound racing competitions in the United Kingdom
Recurring sporting events established in 1945
Recurring events disestablished in 2008
1945 establishments in England
2008 disestablishments in England
Sport in the London Borough of Waltham Forest
Greyhound racing in London